Gynaecopolis (City of Women) is an ancient city in Lower Egypt.

History
Gynaecopolis was known in Ancient Egypt as 'Per Nebet Imau'. This city was the capital of the Gynaecopolite nome mentioned by Strabo, and coins having its impress in the age of Hadrian are still present. Some geographers believe the city of Gynaecopolis is actually the ancient city of Anthylla, even though the former city was found south of what was presumed to be Anthylla. It may have been in the area of Kom el-Hisn.

Other information
Herodotus mentions that it used to furnish the ancient Egyptian queens with sandals and other female goods.
It was assigned by Persian kings of Egypt to their queens, to provide them with sandals or girdles.

References

Archaeological sites in Egypt
Former populated places in Egypt